Manuel Kindl (born January 3, 1993) is a German professional ice hockey defenceman. He is currently playing for Augsburger Panther in the Deutsche Eishockey Liga (DEL).

References

External links
 
 

1993 births
Living people
Augsburger Panther players
German ice hockey defencemen
Sportspeople from Augsburg